Anderson da Silveira Ribeiro (born November 4, 1988), commonly known as Anderson Pico, is a Brazilian wingback and full back who plays for Cruzeiro-RS.

Playing career
Anderson Pico's main position is at left-back but he can also switch to right-back, or even on the wing (left or right). He began his professional career at Grêmio Foot-Ball Porto Alegrense. In July 2007, he was promoted to the first team due to the transfer of Lucio and injury to Bruno Teles, soon establishing himself as a core member. However, a series of poor performances led to him being dropped. The main complaint from then coach Mano Menezes was that Anderson Pico had no tactical awareness, and did not get back to defend quickly enough from supporting play.

In early 2008, Anderson Pico went through an even worse phase when he returned from holiday overweight and struggled with regain his fitness. In the first half of the year, he oscillated with Hidalgo as a first team starter. However, Pico was on the substitute's bench at the end of April when Helder took charge of the position. However, in July when, after a suspension of Helder, Anderson Pico regained his place in the first team.

Newly promoted German Bundesliga club TSG 1899 Hoffenheim was reported to have an interest in buying Anderson Pico from Grêmio during May 2008.  Manager Ralf Rangnick travelled to Porto Alegre to observe the player in action.

Anderson Pico still has some defensive problems, such as poor marking. However, the strong support he provides on the left, crosses and runs make him a strong first team choice.

On February 28, 2009, Pico left Grêmio and signed a contract with Figueirense on loan to 31 December 2009.

On July 12, 2010, Anderson Pico was loaned to Brasiliense, to help the team's struggle to return to the elite of Brazilian soccer. In October 2010 Anderson signed a contract with the Pico Youth Caxias do Sul to rival Gauchão 2011.

Flamengo
Anderson Pico was signed by Flamengo on September 5, 2014.

Dnipro Dnipropetrovsk
In August 2015, Flamengo loaned Anderson Pico to Ukrainian club Dnipro Dnipropetrovsk for a season-long loan.

Career statistics
(Correct )

Honours
Grêmio
Rio Grande do Sul State League: 2007

References

External links
 
 

1988 births
Living people
Brazilian footballers
Campeonato Brasileiro Série A players
Campeonato Brasileiro Série B players
Grêmio Foot-Ball Porto Alegrense players
Figueirense FC players
Associação Esportiva e Recreativa Santo Ângelo players
Brasiliense Futebol Clube players
Esporte Clube Juventude players
Esporte Clube São José players
Associação Chapecoense de Futebol players
Esporte Clube Novo Hamburgo players
CR Flamengo footballers
Ukrainian Premier League players
Ukrainian Second League players
FC Dnipro players
Kisvárda FC players
Grêmio Esportivo Juventus players
FC Metalist Kharkiv players
Sport Club São Paulo players
Esporte Clube Cruzeiro players
Nemzeti Bajnokság I players
Brazilian expatriate footballers
Brazilian expatriate sportspeople in Ukraine
Expatriate footballers in Ukraine
Brazilian expatriate sportspeople in Hungary
Expatriate footballers in Hungary
Association football defenders
Footballers from Porto Alegre